

Final standings
Note: GP = Games played, W = Wins, L = Losses, T = Ties, GF = Goals for, GA = Goals against, Pts = Points.

The Vancouver Griffins played a 31 game exhibition schedule, against male and female Canadian Interuniversity Athletics Union teams, British Columbia and Alberta provincial women's teams, and NWHL teams.

Playoffs

The Beatrice Aeros won the Championship of the NWHL.

See also
 National Women's Hockey League (1999–2007) (NWHL)

References

National Women's Hockey League (1999–2007) seasons
NWHL